Ultrasonic Broadcasting System, Inc. (UBSI) is a Philippine radio network owned by the SYSU Group of Companies, a conglomerate owned by the Sy family. UBSI owns a number of FM stations across the country under the Energy FM brand.

History
UBSI was founded by the Sy family in 1991 with the launch of K-LOVE 1494.

In 1996, UBSI hired former station manager of DZMB and radio consultant Manuelito "Manny" F. Luzon as general manager. Under Luzon's management, he conceptualized a new FM network called Energy FM. It was launched first in Davao, followed by another station in Cebu (later transferred to 89.1 FM from 2003 to 2004) and in Naga.

In 2003, UBSI acquired the airtime lease of Metro Manila station DWKY 91.5 (owned by Mabuhay Broadcasting System, whom Luzon is also the FM operations consultant of the said company) and became 91.5 Energy FM. A year later in 2004, UBSI sold DWSS to FBS Radio Network, in exchange of the latter's stations in Dagupan and Cebu.

In 2009, DWKY, together with its provincial stations, won in the 18th KBP Golden Dove Awards as Best FM Station of the year.

In 2011, a year after Luzon left the company for PBC, Energy FM officially transferred its Manila station to 106.7 FM under a transitional partnership with station owner Dream FM Network of Tonyboy Cojuangco, with UBSI acquired the full-control of the station months later.

UBSI radio stations

Notes

References

Radio stations in the Philippines
Companies based in Pasig